Henry 'Harry' Thomas Rawlinson (21 January 1963 – 28 February 2011) was an English first-class cricketer.

Rawlinson was born at Edgware in January 1963. He was educated at Eton College, before going up to Trinity College, Oxford. While studying at Oxford, he played first-class cricket for Oxford University, making his debut against Worcestershire at Oxford in 1982. He played first-class cricket for Oxford until 1984, making a total of sixteen appearances. Playing primarily as a right-arm medium pace bowler, he took 23 wickets in his sixteen matches, at an average of 61.17. He took one five wicket haul, with figures of 5 for 123 against Worcestershire in 1983. As a lower order batsman, he scored 156 runs with a high score of 24. 

Rawlinson died in February 2011 at Ingtham, Kent following a battle with cancer. He was survived by his wife and three children. His brother, John, played first-class cricket, as did his nephew Hugo Rawlinson.

References

External links

1963 births
2011 deaths
People from Edgware
People educated at Eton College
Alumni of Christ Church, Oxford
English cricketers
Oxford University cricketers
Deaths from cancer in England
People from Ightham